Vassar may refer to:
 Vassar Brothers Medical Center
 Vassar College
 1312 Vassar, an asteroid

People
 John Ellison Vassar (1813–1878), American lay preacher and missionary
 Matthew Vassar (1792–1868), American brewer and merchant, founder of Vassar College
 Phil Vassar (born 1964), American country music artist
 Vassar B. Carlton (1912–2005), American jurist
 Vassar Clements (1928–2005), American fiddler
 Vassar Miller (1924–1998), American writer and poet

Places
 Vassar, Manitoba, Canada
 Vassar, Idaho, US
 Vassar, Kansas, US
 Vassar, Michigan, US
 Vassar Township, Michigan, US
 Vassar Glacier, Alaska, US

See also
 Vassar-Smith baronets